Tan Sri Datuk Seri Law Hieng Ding (4 October 1935 – 25 December 2018) was a Malaysian politician. He was the Minister of Science, Technology and Environment from 1990 to 2004. Between 1982 and 2008, Law was a member of parliament representing Sarikei.

Education
He graduated from Nanyang University, Singapore in 1960 with a bachelor's degree of Commerce in Accountancy and Banking.

Career and politics
Law started his political career in 1972 and has held the seat for the past six terms. He was a deputy minister from 1987 to 1990, and a Cabinet Minister from 1990 to 2004. He was also the Deputy President of Sarawak United People's Party (SUPP) and Nantah Education & Research Foundation as well as chairman or director to a number of public companies and foundation.

Death
Law died on 25 December 2018 at the age of 82 during the Christmas Day celebration.

Election results

Honours
  :
  Commander of the Order of Loyalty to the Crown of Malaysia (PSM) - Tan Sri (2005)
  :
  Knight Commander of the Most Exalted Order of the Star of Sarawak (PNBS) - Dato Sri (1992)
  :
  Commander of the Order of the Defender of State (DGPN) - Dato' Seri (2001)

References

 

 

1936 births
2018 deaths
Nanyang University alumni
Malaysian politicians of Chinese descent
Malaysian Methodists
Sarawak United Peoples' Party politicians
Environment ministers of Malaysia
Science ministers of Malaysia
Members of the Dewan Rakyat
Members of the Dewan Negara
21st-century Malaysian politicians
20th-century Malaysian politicians
Knights Commander of the Most Exalted Order of the Star of Sarawak
Malaysian Protestants
Commanders of the Order of Loyalty to the Crown of Malaysia